Mount Dougherty is a mountain,  high, between Mount Sandved and Mount Cara on the main north–south ridge in the northern part of the Queen Elizabeth Range. It was mapped by the United States Geological Survey from tellurometer surveys and Navy air photos, 1960–62, and was named by the Advisory Committee on Antarctic Names for Ellsworth C. Dougherty, a United States Antarctic Research Program biologist at McMurdo Sound, 1959–60 and 1961–62.

References 

Mountains of the Ross Dependency
Shackleton Coast